ARA Bahía Paraíso was an Argentine navy auxiliary ship that sunk in 1989,  from Palmer Station at Arthur Harbor, Antarctica,
resulting in a  oil spill.

Construction and design
Bahía Paraíso was ordered by the Argentine Navy on 27 February 1979 as a supply ship for use in Antarctic waters. The ship was launched from the Argentine shipyard Astilleros Príncipe y Menghi SA on 3 July 1980, entering service on 3 December 1981, with the pennant number Q 6.

The ship had an icebreaking hull. Displacement was  full load.

The ship's holds had a capacity of  dry cargo, with an additional  refrigerated storage, together with 1200 tons of cargo fuel. A flight deck and hangar for two helicopters was fitted. The ship had a crew of 124, and could carry 84 civilian passengers, who could be replaced by 252 troops.

Operational history 

The ship operated as a naval auxiliary vessel from 1981 to 1986 and served in the Falklands War as a troop transport as well as a hospital ship. It was involved in transporting troops to Leith Harbour prior to the Invasion of South Georgia.

After the war it reverted as an Antarctic supply ship for the Navy with occasional tourists on board. It was on a resupply trip with tourists to Antarctica at the time of the sinking off Anvers Island. Passengers and crew were rescued by the Spanish Navy oceanographic research vessel Las Palmas.

See also 
 List of auxiliary ships of the Argentine Navy

Notes

References

Citations

Bibliography

Further reading 

Transports of the Argentine Navy
Maritime incidents in 1989
Shipwrecks of Argentina
1980 ships
Ships built in Argentina